Bernard Cornut-Gentille (26 July 1909 – 21 January 1992) was a French administrator and politician.

Born in Brest, Finistère, Cornut-Gentille studied at the École Libre des Sciences Politiques. In 1943 he was appointed as the Subprefect of Reims, but resigned to assist the Free French delegate Émile Bollaert. Following the Liberation of France he served as Prefect of Ille-et-Vilaine, of the Somme, and of the Bas-Rhin. In 1948 he was appointed High Commissioner in French Equatorial Africa then, from 1951 to 1956, High Commissioner in French West Africa.

After this, he served as France's permanent representative to the United Nations Security Council, and in 1957 as ambassador to Argentina.

Standing for the Gaullist Party, the UNR, he was elected to represent Alpes-Maritimes in the 1958 election to the National Assembly of France. He had been minister without portfolio in June 1958, then Minister of Overseas France from 3 June 1958 to 8 January 1959 in the governments of Charles de Gaulle. Under Michel Debré he served as Minister of Posts, Telegraphs, and Telephones from 8 January 1959 to 5 February 1960. He resigned ministerial office at the same time as Jacques Soustelle, over the handling of the affair of the barricades in Algiers and broke with the Gaullists.

He sat in the National Assembly as an independent until 1968 and again from 1973 to 1978. Locally, he served as mayor of Cannes from 1959 to 1978. Here he initiated a programme of redevelopment and renovation.

His nephew François Cornut-Gentille has served as representative of the Haute-Marne department since 1993 and mayor of Saint-Dizier since 1995.

External links
  Biography at the website of the Assemblée nationale

1909 births
1992 deaths
Politicians from Brest, France
Union for the New Republic politicians
French Ministers of the Colonies
French Ministers of Overseas France
French Ministers of Posts, Telegraphs, and Telephones
Deputies of the 1st National Assembly of the French Fifth Republic
Deputies of the 2nd National Assembly of the French Fifth Republic
Deputies of the 3rd National Assembly of the French Fifth Republic
Deputies of the 5th National Assembly of the French Fifth Republic
Permanent Representatives of France to the United Nations
Ambassadors of France to Argentina
Prefects of France
Prefects of Ille-et-Vilaine
Prefects of Somme (department)
Prefects of Bas-Rhin
Sciences Po alumni
Mayors of places in Provence-Alpes-Côte d'Azur